The 2012 European Universities Games, were the first European Universities Games, hosted by Córdoba, Spain  between July 13 and 23, 2012.

Bid selection
The 1st edition of EUG was attributed by EUSA in March 2010 during the Executive Committee meeting in Vilnius. Other candidates were also Lisbon, Portugal and Łódź, Poland.

Sports
Following is a list of the sports that was contested at the 2012 European Universities Games:

Participating nations
All member countries of the European University Sports Association were invited to take part in the 2012 European Universities Games. At the moment of invitation, the European University Sports Association counted 43 members.

Eventually Córdoba hosted 2583 participants in 253 teams from 151 universities coming from 32 countries.

See also
 European University Sports Association
 2016 European Universities Games

References

External links
European University Sports Association's Website
2012 European Universities Games's official website

2012 in multi-sport events
European Universities Games
Sport in Córdoba, Spain
July 2012 sports events in Europe
2012 in Spanish sport